Ramiro Ángel Carrera (born 24 October 1993) is an Argentine footballer who plays as a midfielder for Liga MX club Cruz Azul.

External links 
 

1993 births
Living people
Footballers from La Plata
Argentine footballers
Argentine expatriate footballers
Association football midfielders
Arsenal de Sarandí footballers
Club de Gimnasia y Esgrima La Plata footballers
Unión Española footballers
Atlético Tucumán footballers
Chilean Primera División players
Argentine Primera División players
Expatriate footballers in Chile
Argentine expatriate sportspeople in Chile